Norman Seabrook is an American former law enforcement officer and union leader who was the president of the Correction Officers' Benevolent Association from 1995 to 2016.

Career
Seabrook became a corrections officer in 1985. He received his Bachelor of Arts degree from Empire State College. As leader of COBA, which represents more than 9,000 officers within the New York City Department of Correction, Seabrook was known for his strong defense for union members, and was said by The New York Times to be a "roadblock to reform". Seabrook was described by the New York Times as being a "powerbroker" in New York City.

Seabrook was instrumental in pushing through the "Feces Bill" which made it a felony to throw feces at a corrections officer. Seabrook fought for deals, sometimes in unison with other city unions, including the Police Benevolent Association of the City of New York and the Uniformed Firefighters Association. Seabrook lobbied for corrections officers to gain parity with the NYPD and the FDNY in pay and benefits. In 2001, Seabrook was appointed by New York Governor George Pataki to the three-person, bipartisan "Task Force to Reform New York State and New York City Elections".

Seabrook hosted his own radio show called, Real Talk, Real Time on WWRL 1600 AM in New York City market. This show aired weekly on Fridays.

Criminal issues
Seabrook was charged with taking a $60,000 bribe in connection with a $20 million investment of union members' money. Seabrook was said to have been "presented with a Ferragamo bag by Jona Rechnitz." $19 million of that investment was lost, but through lengthy deals $4.5 million has been restituted. Seabrook was indicated by a federal grand jury on July 7, 2016, along with co-defendant Murray Huberfeld. Huberfield was the founder of Platinum Partners, a hedge fund to which COBA funds would be directed by Seabrook. In return for the COBA investments, Seabrook received kickbacks of between $100,000 and $150,000, depending on the amount invested by COBA. The first trial ended in a hung jury. In the second trial, Seabrook was convicted of corruption and was sentenced to 58 months in prison.   After losing his appeal, Seabrook was told by the judge that he had to begin to serve his 58 month sentence by December 2020.

In a last-ditch effort to stay out of prison, his legal team filed a compassionate release motion expressing concerns of COVID-19. Judge Alvin Hellerstein ruled that Seabrook first had to be in prison before he filed such a motion. Also at this time, a picture of Seabrook without his mask on in public was circulating.

As a result of the legal issues, his bank attempted to foreclose on his home.

References

Prison officer organisations
American trade union leaders
Living people
Leaders of organizations
Criminals from New York (state)
Criminals from New York City
New York City Department of Correction
1960 births
Empire State College alumni